Kalya is an administrative ward in Uvinza District of Kigoma Region in Tanzania. 
In 2016 the Tanzania National Bureau of Statistics report there were 24,751 people in the ward, from 22,486 in 2012.

Villages / neighborhoods 
The ward has 3 villages and 18 hamlets.

 Sibwesa
 Katobelo
 Mtakuja
 Songambele
 Tujitegemee
 Tupendane
 Kalya
 Kagwila
 Kankuba
 Kapama
 Katunka
 Mlela
 Tumbushe
 Kashughulu
 Kampisa
 Kisinsa
 Lufubu
 Mjimwema
 Mpanga
 Ubanda
 Ugalaba

References

Wards of Kigoma Region